The IBM System/370 Model 165 (and the Model 155)
were jointly announced June 30, 1970
as "designed for ... the Seventies." That same day IBM announced the 370/195.  They were the first three models of the IBM System/370 line of computers.

Three months later a fourth IBM System/370, the Model 145, was announced. Since none of them came with virtual memory, "which was to be a hallmark of the 370 line" some said about these early members of the IBM System/370 family, especially about the 165 & 155, that they were not "the real 370 line."

Growth path
The initially announced System/370 Models 165 & 155 systems were in many ways merely improved IBM System/360 systems.
 Both were announced to "run under proven OS programming support." (meaning the non-virtual memory MFT or MVT Operating systems)
 As compared to the 360, their basic architecture was described as "extended, but not redesigned, for System/370.
 The IBM System/360 Model 85 used microcode to control instruction execution, unlike the completely-hardwired 360/75 and 360/91; the high-end models of System/370 were also microcoded. Some describe the 360/85 as a bridge to the 370/165.

Upgrade option
In 1972 an upgrade option was announced "to provide the hardware necessary to operate in a virtual memory mode."

Unlike the IBM System/370 Model 145, which as early as June 1971 could have virtual memory capability added to it with a simple microcode update from a floppy disk, the Model 155 and Model 165 needed expensive hardware additions - $200,000 for the 155 and $400,000 for the 165 - to add virtual memory capability, and even this had to
wait until 1972. An upgraded 165 was known as an IBM System/370 Model 165-II.

Emulation
The 370/165, when equipped with the appropriate compatibility feature, with the use of an emulator program permits running
 7070, 7072 and 7074 programs
 IBM 7080 programs
 709, 7040, 7044, 7094 and 7094 II programs.
The IBM 7070/7074 Compatibility Feature allowed the 165 to "run 7070 and 7074 programs at speeds that, in general, equal or exceed those of the original systems" and yet "not affect normal operation of System/370."

Physical memory
Although the joint 155/165 announcement did not have the word virtual, there were multiple references to (physical) memory, storage (both main memory and disk storage), and cache memory under the name "buffer".

The 155 had seven main memory choices, ranging from 256K to 2 MB; the 165: five possibilities, from 512K to 3 MB. Both models were described as having "a very high-performance buffer storage backed by a large" main memory.

See also
 List of IBM products
 IBM System/360
 IBM System/370

Notes

References

IBM System/360 mainframe line
Computer-related introductions in 1970